Krakus II was a mythological ruler of Poland. He was the successor of and son of the alleged founder of the City of Kraków,  Krakus I, and he was the younger brother of Lech II, according to Wincenty Kadłubek. He ties the family to the national story of the dragon of Wawel. In this, their father Krak sent them to defeat the dragon, which they managed, after an unsuccessful battle, by stuffing the tribute animals with straw which suffocated the dragon. After this, Krak threw himself upon Lech and killed him, though their father pretended that the dragon was responsible. Eventually the story was found out, and Krak II was overthrown and replaced by his daughter Wanda.

However, according to Jan Długosz, Krakus was the elder son and was murdered by Lech after Krak slew the dragon. This occurred after their father's death.

Notes

Bibliography 
 Mistrz Wincenty Kadłubek: Kronika Polska. Wrocław: Rebis, 2003, s. 13–15. .
 Jerzy Strzelczyk: Mity, podania i wierzenia dawnych Słowian. Poznań: Rebis, 2007. .

Legendary Polish monarchs
Polish princes
Nobility from Kraków